Glynn Ray Cyprien (born September 13, 1966) is an American basketball coach who is currently an assistant coach at Texas Tech. He was formerly an assistant under Billy Kennedy at Texas A&M University in College Station.  He previously assisted Josh Pastner at the University of Memphis, Billy Gillispie at the University of Kentucky, and prior to that was an assistant coach at the University of Arkansas, New Mexico State, Oklahoma State, UNLV, Western Kentucky, and Jacksonville University.

In 2004, Cyprien briefly served as head coach at the University of Louisiana at Lafayette before being fired for falsely claiming to have completed his bachelor's degree at the University of Texas–San Antonio; he had instead completed bachelor's and master's degrees from Lacrosse University, an unaccredited distance learning institution.  He has also served as an assistant coach at Lamar and Texas-San Antonio.

On January 9, 2017, Glynn was named head coach of the Grizzlies' NBA Developmental League affiliate, the Iowa Energy. In the 2017–18 season, he continued as head coach with the Grizzlies' new affiliate, the Memphis Hustle.

Cyprien lettered two seasons as a player at Southern University-New Orleans.

He has been a member of the National Association of Basketball Coaches (NABC) for 18 years and the Black Coaches Association (BCA) for 13 years.

Cyprien is married to the former Monique Bouldin. They have two children.

References

External links
 Texas Tech profile

1966 births
Living people
American men's basketball players
Arkansas Razorbacks men's basketball coaches
Basketball coaches from Louisiana
Basketball players from New Orleans
Jacksonville Dolphins men's basketball coaches
Kentucky Wildcats men's basketball coaches
Lamar Cardinals basketball coaches
Memphis Hustle coaches
Memphis Tigers men's basketball coaches
New Mexico State Aggies men's basketball coaches
Oklahoma State Cowboys basketball coaches
Southern University at New Orleans alumni
Sportspeople from New Orleans
Texas A&M Aggies men's basketball coaches
UNLV Runnin' Rebels basketball coaches
UTSA Roadrunners men's basketball coaches
Western Kentucky Hilltoppers basketball coaches